Robert A. Lang was a Republican member of the Wisconsin State Assembly during the 1903 session. Lang represented the 1st District of Eau Claire County, Wisconsin.

References

People from Eau Claire County, Wisconsin
Republican Party members of the Wisconsin State Assembly
Year of birth missing
Year of death missing